The 2018 Men's European Water Polo Championship was held in Barcelona, Spain from 16 to 28 July 2018.

Serbia won their fourth consecutive and eighth overall title by defeating Spain in the final.

Qualification

Sixteen teams will be allowed to the tournament. The qualification is as follows:
 The host nation
 The best seven teams from the 2016 European Championships not already qualified as the host nation
 Eight teams from the qualifiers

Format
The sixteen teams were split in four groups with four teams each. The first classified team of each group qualified directly for the quarterfinals, the second and third teams played each other in cross group format to qualify for the quarterfinals.

Squads

Draw
The draw of the tournament took take place on 7 March in Barcelona. The first batch consisted of the teams ranked 1st to 4th in the 2016 European Championships, the second batch consisted of the teams ranked 5th to eight. The third batch was filled with teams that qualified in the qualifiers.

Preliminary round
All times are local (UTC+2).

Group A

Group B

Group C

Group D

Knockout stage

5th place bracket

9th place bracket

13th place bracket

Play-offs

Quarterfinals

13–16th place semifinals

9–12th place semifinals

5–8th place semifinals

Semifinals

15th place game

13th place game

Eleventh place game

Ninth place game

Seventh place game

Fifth place game

Third place game

Final

Final ranking

Awards and statistics

Awards

Top goalscorers

Source: wp2018bcn.microplustiming.com

Top goalkeepers

Source: wp2018bcn.microplustiming.com

References

External links
Official website

Men
Men's European Water Polo Championship
International water polo competitions hosted by Spain
Men's European Water Polo Championship
Men's European Water Polo Championship
Sports competitions in Barcelona
2010s in Barcelona
Men's European Water Polo Championship